Ibadi may refer to:
Ibāḍī, member of a sect of Islam separate from the Sunni and Shia sects
ʿIbādī, also spelled as Ebadi, member of a Christian Arab community in al-Hirah, now also a common surname in the Muslim world
Ibadi (band), a Korean modern folk/acoustic pop band

See also
Ebadi (disambiguation)